A list of American films released in 1932. 
Grand Hotel won Best Picture at the Academy Awards.

A-B

C-D

E-F

G-H

I-K

L-M

N-O

P-R

S-T

U-V

W-Z

See also
 1932 in the United States

References

External links

1932 films at the Internet Movie Database

1932
Films
Lists of 1932 films by country or language